Ouanaminthe Airport is a small airport that serves the city of Ouanaminthe in the Nord-Est department of Haiti, on the border with Dominican Republic.

See also

Transport in Haiti
List of airports in Haiti

References

External links
OpenStreetMap - Ouanaminthe
MAF charter air service

Airports in Haiti
Nord-Est (department)